The 1990 Southeastern Conference baseball tournament was held at the Hoover Metropolitan Stadium in Hoover, Alabama from May 17 through 20.  and Mississippi State were declared co-champions the tournament as a result of a weather-cancelled championship game.

Regular season results

Tournament 

 ^: LSU and Mississippi State were declared 1990 tournament co-champions by SEC commissioner Roy Kramer when lightning and rain ended play in the championship game with LSU leading 6–0 with one out in the bottom of the fourth inning.

All-Tournament Team

See also 
 College World Series
 NCAA Division I Baseball Championship
 Southeastern Conference baseball tournament

References 

 SECSports.com All-Time Baseball Tournament Results
 SECSports.com All-Tourney Team Lists

Tournament
Southeastern Conference Baseball Tournament
Southeastern Conference baseball tournament
Southeastern Conference baseball tournament
College sports tournaments in Alabama
Baseball competitions in Hoover, Alabama